Gustavo Franchetto (Verona, 21 January 1953) is an Italian politician from Veneto.

A long-time Christian Democrat, he was first elected to the Regional Council of Veneto in 2000 for Together for Veneto, a centrist alliance comprising the Italian People's Party, The Democrats and Italian Renewal. In 2005 he was re-elected for Democracy is Freedom – The Daisy and then joined the Democratic Party. In 2008 he decided to leave the Democrats and to join Italy of Values instead. Re-elected in 2010, he served as floor leader of his new party.

References

1953 births
Living people
Politicians from Verona
Democracy is Freedom – The Daisy politicians
Democratic Party (Italy) politicians
21st-century Italian politicians
Italy of Values politicians
Members of the Regional Council of Veneto